Burshi is a rural locality (a selo) and the administrative centre of Burshinsky Selsoviet, Laksky District, Republic of Dagestan, Russia. The population was 211 as of 2010. There is 1 street.

Geography 
Burshi is located 23 km south of Kumukh (the district's administrative centre) by road, on the Artsalinekh River. Khulisma is the nearest rural locality.

Demographics 
The village is predominantly inhabited by the Laks ethnic group.

Notable people 

 Islam Makhachev, mixed martial artist, current UFC Lightweight Champion

References 

Rural localities in Laksky District